Martin Kovaľ (born 10 February 1999) is a professional Slovak footballer who plays as a winger.

Club career

FK Senica
Kovaľ made his Fortuna Liga debut for Senica against Ružomberok on 6 May 2017, coming on as a 75th minute substitute for Boris Bališ. During his tenure Erik Daniel had scored the second goal for Ružomberok and Adam Pajer connected sole strike for Senica in the 1:2 home defeat.

References

External links
 FC ViOn Zlaté Moravce official club profile 
 
 Futbalnet profile 
 

1999 births
Living people
Footballers from Bratislava
Slovak footballers
Slovakia youth international footballers
Slovakia under-21 international footballers
Association football forwards
FK Senica players
MŠK Žilina players
MFK Skalica players
FC ViOn Zlaté Moravce players
Slovak Super Liga players
2. Liga (Slovakia) players